Christian Carmack Sanderson (1882–1966) was a teacher, fiddler, square dance caller, poet, and noted local historian in southeastern Pennsylvania in the early to mid-20th century. He corresponded with a wide range of notable people of his time and was a remarkable collector of historical memorabilia (which are the basis of the collections on display in the Christian C. Sanderson Museum).

Sanderson lived the latter part of his life in Chadds Ford, Pennsylvania and was friends with the Wyeth family there (including artists N.C., Andrew and Jamie). From 1906 to 1922, Sanderson lived in the Benjamin Ring House, which was Washington's Headquarters before and after the Battle of Brandywine and "more than any individual in his time, Christian Sanderson focused attention on the Battle".

Sanderson is the subject of a biography written by his friend Thomas R. Thompson. and a documentary film by Karen Kuder.

See also
Christian C. Sanderson Museum

References

External links
Bio on the Christian C. Sanderson Museum website
Cadot, Agnes A. 1975. "Book Reviews: Chris: A Biography of Christian C. Sanderson, by Thomas R. Thompson." Pennsylvania History 42(1): 89-91)

1882 births
1966 deaths
Historians of Pennsylvania
People from Chadds Ford Township, Pennsylvania
Schoolteachers from Pennsylvania
American fiddlers
20th-century American historians
American male non-fiction writers
Historians from Pennsylvania
20th-century American educators
20th-century violinists
20th-century American male writers